A list of notable Lithuanian artists.



A
Kazys Abromavičius (b. 1928)
Gediminas Akstinas (b. 1961)
Romualdas Aleliūnas (1960-2016)
Zita Alinskaitė-Mickonienė (b. 1939)
Viktoras Andriušis (1908-1967)
Aleksas Andriuškevičius (b. 1959)
Kęstutis Andziulis (b. 1948)
Valentinas Antanavičius (b. 1936)
Kęstutis Antanėlis (b. 1951)
Robertas Antinis (b. 1946)
Neemija Arbitblatas (1908-1999)
Jonas Arčikauskas (b. 1957)

B
Juozas Bagdonas (1911-2005)
Arvydas Bagdžius (1958-2008)
Gintautėlė Laimutė Baginskienė (b. 1940)
Ona Baliukonė (1948-2007)
Marija Bankauskaitė (1933-1992)
Angelina Banytė (b. 1949)
Gediminas Baravykas (1940-1995)
Aidas Bareikis (b. 1967)
Ray Bartkus (b. 1961)
Vitalija Bartkuvienė (1939-1996)
Edmundas Benetis (b. 1953)
Vladimiras Beresniovas (b. 1948)
Ilja Bereznickas (b. 1948)
Vytautas Pranas Bičiūnas (1893-1945)
Eglė Bogdanienė (b. 1962)
Alina Briedelytė-Kavaliauskienė (1942-1992)
Albertas Broga (b. 1951)
Danguolė Brogienė (b. 1959)
Konstancija Brundzaitė (1942-1971)
Bronius Bružas (b. 1941)
Eugenijus Mindaugas Budrys (1925-2007)
Ignas Budrys (1933-1999)
Ona Danutė Buivydaitė (b. 1947)
Bernardas Bučas (1903-1979)
Nijolė Būraitė (b. 1956)

Č
Vytautas Edmundas Čekanauskas (1930-2010)
Gražutė Čepaitė-Ragauskienė (b. 1940)
Mikalojus Konstantinas Čiurlionis (1875-1911)

D
Romas Dalinkevičius (1950-2001)
Jonas Damelis (1780-1840)
Viktorija Daniliauskaitė (b. 1951)
Jonas Daniliauskas (b. 1950)
Zinaida Irutė Dargienė (b. 1936)
Feliksas Daukantas (1915-1995)
Gražina Degutytė-Švažienė (b. 1938)
Gražina Didžiūnaitytė (1940-2008)
Boleslovas Dluskis (1826-1905)
Mykolas Dluskis (1760-1821)
Vincentas Dmachauskas (1807-1862)
Vsevolodas Dobužinskis (1906-1998)
Pranas Domšaitis (1880-1965)
Olga Dubeneckienė (1891-1967)
Vladimiras Dubeneckis (1888-1932)
Audrius Dzikaras (b. 1957)
Rimantas Dūda (b. 1953)
Marija Dūdienė (b. 1927)

E
Stasys Eidrigevičius (b. 1949)
Danutė Eidukaitė (1929-1995)
Albinas Elskus (1926-2007)

F
Vaclava Fleri (1888-1983)

G
Adomas Galdikas (1893-1969)
Petronėlė Gerlikienė (1905-1979)
Albertas Gurskas (b. 1935)
Aldona Gustas (b. 1932)

J
Osvaldas Jablonskis (b. 1944)
Feliksas Jakubauskas (b. 1949)
Antanas Janauskas (1937-2016)
Vladas Jankauskas (1923-1983)
Juozas Jankus (1912-1999)
Vytautas Janulionis (1958-2010)
Stanislovas Jančiukas (1937-2006)
Antanas Jaroševičius (1870-1956)
Lilija Eugenija Jasiūnaitė (b. 1944)
Ramutė Aleksandra Jasudytė (b. 1930)
Vidmantas Jažauskas (b. 1961)
Rūta Jokubonienė (1930-2010)
Aldona Jonuškaitė-Šaltenienė (b. 1943)
Vytautas Kazimieras Jonynas (1907-1997)
Eugenijus Kazimieras Jovaiša (b. 1940)
Dalia Juknevičiūtė (1935-1975)
Jaronimas Kastytis Juodikaitis (1932-2000)
Paulius Jurkus (1916-2004)
Virginija Juršienė (b. 1950)
Vidmantas Jusionis (b. 1961)

K
Juozas Kalinauskas (b. 1935)
Virginija Kalinauskaitė (b. 1957)
Petras Kalpokas (1880-1945)
Zinaida Kalpokovaitė-Vogėlienė (b. 1941)
Juozas Kamarauskas (1874-1946)
Juozas Kaminskas (1898-1957)
Viktorija Karatajūtė-Šarauskienė (b. 1948)
Eugenijus Karpavičius (1953-2010)
Kęstutis Kasparavičius (b. 1954)
Jonas Kaupys (1941-2000)
Steponas Kazimieraitis (1933-1995)
Arvydas Každailis (b. 1939)
Žilvinas Kempinas (b. 1969)
Augis Kepežinskas (b. 1948)
Galius Kličius (b. 1950)
Boleslovas Klova (1927-1986)
Ramunė Kmieliauskaitė (b. 1960)
Gurwin Kopel (1923-1990)
Kęstutis Krasauskas (b. 1968)
Lolita Kreivaitienė (b. 1960)
Zita Kreivytė (b. 1942)
Ona Kreivytė-Naruševičienė (b. 1935)
Lazar Krestin (1868-1938)
Elvyra Katalina Kriaučiūnaitė (b. 1942)
Remigijus Kriukas (b. 1961)
Antanas Krištopaitis (1921-2011)
Vaclovas Krutinis (1948-2013)
Marijonas Kuleša (1878-1943)
Mykolas Kuleša (1799-1863)
Alfredas Kulpa-Kulpavičius (1923-2007)
Raminta Elena Kuprevičienė (b. 1938)
Jolanta Kvašytė (b. 1956)
Jonas Kvederavičius (1923-2002)
Danutė Kvietkevičiūtė (b. 1939)

L
Romualdas Lankauskas (1932-2020)
Jovita Laurušaitė (b. 1956)
Violeta Laužonytė (b. 1955)
Šarūnas Leonavičius (b. 1960)
Inga Likšaitė (b. 1972)
Filomena Linčiūtė-Vaitiekūnienė (b. 1942)
Aldona Ličkutė-Jusionienė (1928-2007)
Laimutis Ločeris (1929-2018)
Česlovas Lukenskas (b. 1959)
Kęstutis Lupeikis (b. 1962)
Juozas Lebednykas (b. 1947)

M
Marija Mackelaitė (b. 1930)
Kiprijonas Maculevičius
Balys Macutkevičius (1905-1964)
Marija Mačiulienė (b. 1929)
Vilmantas Marcinkevičius (b. 1969)
Lidija Meškaitytė (1926-1993)
Kazys Morkūnas (1925-2014)

N
Kazimieras Naruševičius (1920-2004)
Henrikas Natalevičius (b. 1953)

O
Vita Opolskytė (b. 1992)

P
Andrius Petkus (b. 1976), sculptor
Algirdas Petrulis (1915-2010)
Stasys Povilaitis (1947-2015) (jaunesnysis)
Grytė Pintukaite (b. 1977)

R
Petras Repšys (b. 1940)
Vytenis Rimkus (b. 1930)
Petras Rimša (1881-1961)
Bronislovas Rudys (b. 1954)

S
Šarūnas Sauka (b. 1958)
Lasar Segall (1891-1957)
Nikodemas Silvanavičius (1834-1919)
Algis Skačkauskas (1955-2009)
Pranciškus Smuglevičius (1745-1807)
Gintaras Sodeika (b. 1961)
Vigintas Stankus (b. 1962)
Aloyzas Stasiulevičius (b. 1931)
Liudvikas Strolis (1905-1996)
Yehezkel Streichman (1906-1993)

Š
Kazys Šimonis (1887-1978)
Rimantas Šulskis (1943-1995)

T
Domicėlė Tarabildienė (1912-1985)
Vytautas Tomaševičius (b. 1972)
Ivanas Trutnevas (1827-1912)

V
Vytautas Valius (1930-2004)
Adomas Varnas (1879-1979)
Kazys Varnelis (1917-2010)
Audra Vau (b. 1965)
Sofija Veiverytė (1926-2009)
Liudas Vilimas (1912-1966)
Bronius Vyšniauskas (1923-2015)
Petras Vyšniauskas (b. 1957)

Ž
Irena Trečiokaitė-Žebenkienė (1909-1985)
Antanas Žmuidzinavičius (1876-1966)
Algimantas Žižiūnas (b. 1940)

Lists of artists by nationality

Artists